John Leonard Douglas Haig Dyte (October 13, 1918 – April 9, 1974) was a Canadian ice hockey defenceman who played 27 games in the National Hockey League for the Chicago Black Hawks during the 1943–44 season. The rest of his career, which lasted from 1938 to 1949, was spent in the minor leagues

Career
Dyte played his junior hockey with the Barrie Colts of the Ontario Hockey League and spent one season with the Niagara Falls Cataracts of the OHA Senior A League. After three seasons in the Eastern Hockey League, where Dyte was named to the EAHL All-Star Team in consecutive years (2nd team in 1940, 1st team in 1941), and a season with the Montreal Royals, Dyte signed a free agent contract with the Chicago Blackhawks. He played 27 games with the Black Hawks, scoring one goal.

Dyte finished his career playing in the AHL from 1943 until 1946 and would continue to play semi-professional hockey until his retirement after the 1948–49 season.

Career statistics

Regular season and playoffs

External links
 

1918 births
1974 deaths
Baltimore Orioles (ice hockey) players
Buffalo Bisons (AHL) players
Canadian expatriates in the United States
Canadian ice hockey defencemen
Chicago Blackhawks players
Ice hockey people from Ontario
Johnstown Blue Birds players
Montreal Royals (QSHL) players
Ontario Hockey Association Senior A League (1890–1979) players
Sportspeople from Temiskaming Shores
Providence Reds players
St. Louis Flyers players